This is a complete list of ice hockey players who were drafted in the National Hockey League Entry Draft by the Vegas Golden Knights franchise. It includes every player who was drafted, regardless of whether they played for the team. The Golden Knights franchise was founded as an expansion team in Las Vegas, Nevada in 2017.

Key
 Played at least one game with the Golden Knights.
 Spent entire NHL career with the Golden Knights.

Draft picks
 

Statistics are complete as of the 2021–22 NHL season and show each player's career regular season totals in the NHL.  Wins, losses, ties, overtime losses and goals against average apply to goaltenders and are used only for players at that position.

References
General
 
 
Specific

draft
 
Vegas Golden Knights